The World Chess Championship 2007 was held in Mexico City, from 12 September 2007 to 30 September 2007 to decide the world champion of the game of chess. It was an eight-player, double round robin tournament.

Viswanathan Anand of India won the tournament and the title of World Chess Champion. His winning score was 9 points out of 14, with a total of four wins and 10 draws, and Anand was the only undefeated player in the tournament.

Background
This championship was unusual in that the World Chess Championship was decided by a tournament rather than a match.

The FIDE World Chess Championship 2005 was also a double round robin tournament, but at the time the world title was split, with that tournament being for the FIDE world championship, and with Classical World Champion Vladimir Kramnik refusing to take part. Soon after the 2005 tournament, FIDE announced that the 2007 World Championship would also be a double round robin tournament.

In  2006, FIDE announced the World Chess Championship 2006, to reunify the world chess championship. Because the organization of the 2007 tournament was largely in place, conditions of that match included:
 If Classical champion (Kramnik) defeated FIDE Champion Veselin Topalov, Kramnik would take Topalov's place in the 2007 tournament.
 The 2007 tournament would be a world championship.

Kramnik won the 2006 match. In June 2007, Kramnik confirmed that he recognized the 2007 tournament as the world championship, while expressing a personal preference for the championship to be decided by a match.

FIDE later announced that future world championships (beginning with the World Chess Championship 2008) would be decided by matches between the champion and a challenger. At the same time FIDE announced that, as compensation for being denied entry to the 2007 tournament, Topalov would have special privileges in the World Chess Championship 2010 cycle.

Participants

Qualification process
The top four finishers of the 2005 FIDE World Championship event were granted direct entry into the 2007 event. However, Veselin Topalov, FIDE World Chess Champion 2005, was replaced by Vladimir Kramnik, Classical World Chess Champion, after losing his unification match to him in the 2006 World Championship.

Four further players qualified through the 2005–07 qualification process, which consisted of three stages:
Continental championships
2005 World Cup
2007 Candidates Tournament

2005 World Cup

The 2005 World Cup, held in Khanty-Mansiysk, Russia, was the qualification for the Candidates tournament. It was a knock-out tournament of mini-matches, in the style of the FIDE World Chess Championships 1998-2004. However, once 16 players were left, they were no longer immediately eliminated, but played further mini-matches to establish places 1 through 16.

The top finishers were:

The top 10 qualified for the Candidates Tournament. Since Bacrot was already qualified on rating, 11th placed Malakhov also qualified.

2007 Candidates tournament
One place in the Candidates Tournament was reserved for 2004 FIDE World Champion Kasimdzhanov, who had also finished 6th in the 2005 championship tournament. Five places were then awarded to the five highest rated players (average of July 2004 and January 2005 ratings): Leko, Adams, Polgar, Shirov and Bacrot. The remaining ten places went to the highest finishers at the 2005 World Cup who had not otherwise qualified (see above).

The Candidates tournament, held in Elista, Kalmykia, Russia, from 26 May to 14 June 2007, was originally to consist of a two-round knockout with one player qualifying from each quarter of the draw. In September 2006, FIDE proposed that these players play a 16 player, single round-robin tournament instead. However this decision was reversed, and the tournament consisted of two rounds of matches as originally planned.

World Cup winner Aronian was top seed, with the remaining players seeded in rating order according to the January 2006 ratings list. In the second round, the 1v16 winner played the 8v9 winner, 2v15 winner versus 7v10 winner, and so on.

Match conditions
Matches were best of six games, at normal time controls (40/120, then 20/60, then 15 minutes + 30 seconds per move). Where matches were tied after six games, tie breaks were played on the seventh day:

 Best of four rapid games were played. Rapid time control was 25 minutes for the game, plus 10 seconds per move.
 Where the score was still tied, best of two blitz games were played. Blitz time control was 5 minutes for the game, plus 10 seconds per move.
 If the score was still tied, the players would have drawn lots for a single sudden death game where White had six minutes but needed to win, Black had five minutes but only needed to draw. This final stage of tie break, called an Armageddon chess game, was never required.

Round 1
{| class="wikitable"
!Seed!!Name!!Rating!!1!!2!!3!!4!!5!!6!!TB!!Total
|- align=center
| 1
| align=left | 
| 2759
| style="background:black; color:white" | 1
| ½
| style="background:black; color:white" | 0
| 1
| style="background:black; color:white" | 0
| ½
| 4
| 7
|- align=center
| 16
| align=left | 
| 2693
| 0
| style="background:black; color:white" | ½
| 1
| style="background:black; color:white" | 0
| 1
| style="background:black; color:white" | ½
| 2
| 5
|-
!Seed!!Name!!Rating!!1!!2!!3!!4!!5!!6!!TB!!Total
|- align=center 
| 8
| align=left | 
| 2699
| style="background:black; color:white" | ½
| ½
| style="background:black; color:white" | ½
| 0
| style="background:black; color:white" | ½
| 1
| 2½
| 5½
|- align=center
| 9
| align=left | 
| 2734
| ½
| style="background:black; color:white" | ½
| ½
| style="background:black; color:white" | 1
| ½
| style="background:black; color:white" | 0
| ½
| 3½
|-
!Seed!!Name!!Rating!!1!!2!!3!!4!!5!!6!!TB!!Total
|-  align=center
| 2
| align=left | 
| 2738
| ½
| style="background:black; color:white" | 1
| 1
| style="background:black; color:white" | 1
| –
| –
| –
| 3½
|- align=center
| 15
| align=left | 
| 2639
| style="background:black; color:white" | ½
| 0
| style="background:black; color:white" | 0
| 0
| –
| –
| –
| ½
|- 
!Seed!!Name!!Rating!!1!!2!!3!!4!!5!!6!!TB!!Total
|- align=center
| 7
| align=left | 
| 2727
| ½
| style="background:black; color:white" | 0
| ½
| style="background:black; color:white" | 0
| 1
| style="background:black; color:white" | ½
| –
| 2½
|- align=center
| 10
| align=left | 
| 2643
| style="background:black; color:white" | ½
| 1
| style="background:black; color:white" | ½
| 1
| style="background:black; color:white" | 0
| ½
| –
| 3½
|- 
!Seed!!Name!!Rating!!1!!2!!3!!4!!5!!6!!TB!!Total
|- align=center
| 3
| align=left | 
| 2717
| ½
| style="background:black; color:white" | ½
| 0
| style="background:black; color:white" | ½
| ½
| style="background:black; color:white" | ½
| –
| 2½
|- align=center
| 14
| align=left | 
| 2680
| style="background:black; color:white" | ½
| ½
| style="background:black; color:white" | 1
| ½
| style="background:black; color:white" | ½
| ½
| –
| 3½
|- 
!Seed!!Name!!Rating!!1!!2!!3!!4!!5!!6!!TB!!Total
|- align=center
| 6
| align=left | 
| 2717
| 1
| style="background:black; color:white" | ½
| ½
| style="background:black; color:white" | 1
| ½
| –
| –
| 3½
|- align=center
| 11
| align=left | 
| 2679
| style="background:black; color:white" | 0
| ½
| style="background:black; color:white" | ½
| 0
| style="background:black; color:white" | ½
| –
| –
| 1½
|- 
!Seed!!Name!!Rating!!1!!2!!3!!4!!5!!6!!TB!!Total
|- align=center
| 4
| align=left | 
| 2733
| ½
| style="background:black; color:white" | ½
| ½
| style="background:black; color:white" | ½
| ½
| style="background:black; color:white" | ½
| 2½
| 5½
|- align=center
| 13
| align=left | 
| 2677
| style="background:black; color:white" | ½
| ½
| style="background:black; color:white" | ½
| ½
| style="background:black; color:white" | ½
| ½
| ½
| 3½
|- 
!Seed!!Name!!Rating!!1!!2!!3!!4!!5!!6!!TB!!Total
|- align=center
| 5
| align=left | 
| 2709
| style="background:black; color:white" | ½
| 0
| style="background:black; color:white" | 0
| 0
| –
| –
| –
| ½
|- align=center
| 12
| align=left | 
| 2705
| ½
| style="background:black; color:white" | 1
| 1
| style="background:black; color:white" | 1
| –
| –
| –
| 3½
|}

Round 2
{| class="wikitable"
!Seed!!Name!!Rating!!1!!2!!3!!4!!5!!6!!TB!!Total
|- align=center style="background:#ccffcc;"
| 1
| align=left | 
| 2759
| 1
| style="background:black; color:white" | ½
| ½
| style="background:black; color:white" | ½
| ½
| style="background:black; color:white" | ½
| –
| 3½
|- align=center
| 8
| align=left | 
| 2699
| style="background:black; color:white" | 0
| ½
| style="background:black; color:white" | ½
| ½
| style="background:black; color:white" | ½
| ½
| –
| 2½
|- 
!Seed!!Name!!Rating!!1!!2!!3!!4!!5!!6!!TB!!Total
|- align=center style="background:#ccffcc;"
| 2
| align=left | 
| 2738
| 1
| style="background:black; color:white" | ½
| 1
| style="background:black; color:white" | ½
| ½
| –
| –
| 3½
|- align=center
| 10
| align=left | 
| 2643
| style="background:black; color:white" | 0
| ½
| style="background:black; color:white" | 0
| ½
| style="background:black; color:white" | ½
| –
| –
| 1½
|-
!Seed!!Name!!Rating!!1!!2!!3!!4!!5!!6!!TB!!Total
|- align=center style="background:#ccffcc;"
| 4
| align=left | 
| 2733
| style="background:black; color:white" | ½
| ½
| style="background:black; color:white" | 1
| ½
| style="background:black; color:white" | 1
| –
| –
| 3½
|- align=center
| 12
| align=left | 
| 2705
| ½
| style="background:black; color:white" | ½
| 0
| style="background:black; color:white" | ½
| 0
| –
| –
| 1½
|-
!Seed!!Name!!Rating!!1!!2!!3!!4!!5!!6!!TB!!Total
|- align=center style="background:#ccffcc;"
| 6
| align=left | 
| 2717
| 1
| style="background:black; color:white" | ½
| ½
| style="background:black; color:white" | 0
| ½
| style="background:black; color:white" | ½
| 2½
| 5½
|- align=center
| 14
| align=left | 
| 2680
| style="background:black; color:white" | 0
| ½
| style="background:black; color:white" | ½
| 1
| style="background:black; color:white" | ½
| ½
| ½
| 3½
|}

The four second round winners qualified for the championship tournament.

2007 Championship tournament

Playing conditions
The tournament was a double round robin, with the first round on 13 September 2007 and the final round on 29 September 2007. Rest days were on the 17th, 22nd and 26th, that is after rounds 4, 8 and 11. Games each day began at 2 pm local time, which is 19:00 UTC. The time control was 40/2h, 20/1h, 15m+30sec/all meaning that each player had 2 hours per game, plus an extra hour added after the 40th move, 15 extra minutes added after the 60th move, and from there on 30 extra seconds added for each move (Fischer delay). The pairings were made on Wednesday, 12 September 2007.

Results

{| class="wikitable" style="font-size: 95%"
|colspan=4 style="background:#cccccc;"| Round 1–13 September
|-
|Anand      || Gelfand    ||align=center |  ½–½ || C42 Petrov
|-
|Kramnik    || Svidler    ||align=center |  ½–½ || D43 Slav
|-
|Morozevich || Aronian    ||align=center |  ½–½ || E12 Queen's Indian
|-
|Grischuk   || Lékó       ||align=center |  ½–½ || C88 Ruy Lopez
|-
|colspan=4 style="background:#cccccc;"| Round 2–14 September
|-
|Kramnik (½)   || Morozevich (½)||align=center |  1–0 || E04 Catalan
|-
|Gelfand (½)   || Grischuk (½)  ||align=center |  ½–½ || E15 Queen's Indian
|-
|Svidler (½)   || Lékó (½)      ||align=center |  ½–½ || C89 Ruy Lopez
|-
|Aronian (½)   || Anand (½)     ||align=center |  0–1 || D43 QGD
|-
|colspan=4 style="background:#cccccc;"| Round 3–15 September
|-
|Anand (1½)     || Kramnik (1½)   ||align=center |  ½–½ || C42 Petrov
|-
|Grischuk (1)  || Aronian (½)   ||align=center |  ½–½ || C88 Ruy Lopez
|-
|Lékó (1)      || Gelfand (1)   ||align=center |  ½–½ || C42 Petrov
|-
|Morozevich (½)|| Svidler (1)   ||align=center |  1–0 || C45 Scotch
|-
|colspan=4 style="background:#cccccc;"| Round 4–16 September
|-
|Aronian (1)   || Lékó (1½)      ||align=center |  1–0 || A33 Benoni
|-
|Kramnik (2)   || Grischuk (1½)  ||align=center |  ½–½ || E06 Catalan
|-
|Morozevich (1½)|| Anand (2)     ||align=center |  ½–½ || D47 QGD
|-
|Svidler (1)   || Gelfand (1½)   ||align=center |  ½–½ || C42 Petrov
|-
|colspan=4 style="background:#cccccc;"| Round 5–18 September
|-
|Anand (2½)     || Svidler (1½)   ||align=center | 1–0 || C89 Ruy Lopez
|-
|Gelfand (2)   || Aronian (2)   ||align=center | 1–0 || A60 Benoni
|-
|Grischuk (2)  || Morozevich (2)||align=center | 1–0 || D38 QGD
|-
|Lékó (1½)      || Kramnik (2½)   ||align=center | ½–½ || C54 Bishop's
|-
|colspan=4 style="background:#cccccc;"| Round 6–19 September
|-
|Aronian (2)   || Kramnik (3)   ||align=center | ½–½ || E06 Catalan
|-
|Gelfand (3)   || Morozevich (2)||align=center | 1–0 || E17 Queen's Indian
|-
|Grischuk (3)  || Svidler (1½)   ||align=center | ½–½ || D43 Semi-Slav
|-
|Lékó (2)      || Anand (3½)     ||align=center | ½–½ || C78 Ruy Lopez
|-
|colspan=4 style="background:#cccccc;"| Round 7–20 September
|-
|Anand (4)   ||  Grischuk (3½)    ||align=center | 1–0  || C88 Ruy Lopez
|-
|Kramnik (3½)   ||  Gelfand (4) ||align=center | ½–½  || D43 Slav
|-
|Morozevich (2) ||  Lékó (2½)        ||align=center | ½–½  || C45 Scotch
|-
|Svidler (2) || Aronian (2½)   ||align=center | ½–½  || C69 Ruy Lopez
|}

Numbers in parentheses indicate players' scores prior to the round.

Final standings

{| class="wikitable"
|-
!Rank!!Player!!Rating
!colspan="2"|ANA
!colspan="2"|KRA
!colspan="2"|GEL
!colspan="2"|LEK
!colspan="2"|SVI
!colspan="2"|MOR
!colspan="2"|ARO
!colspan="2"|GRI
!Points!!H2H!!Wins!!NS
|- align="center" style="background:white; color:black"
|style="background:#ccffcc;"|1||align="left" style="background:#ccffcc;"|
|style="background:#ccffcc;"|2792
|style="background:gray" colspan="2"| 
|½||style="background:black; color:white"|½
|½||style="background:black; color:white"|½
|½||style="background:black; color:white"|½
|1||style="background:black; color:white"|½
|1||style="background:black; color:white"|½
|½||style="background:black; color:white"|1
|1||style="background:black; color:white"|½
|style="background:#ccffcc;"|9|| style="background:#ccffcc;"| || style="background:#ccffcc;"| || style="background:#ccffcc;"|
|- align="center" style="background:white; color:black"
|2||align="left"|
|2769
|½||style="background:black; color:white"|½
|style="background:gray" colspan="2"| 
|½||style="background:black; color:white"|½
|1||style="background:black; color:white"|½
|½||style="background:black; color:white"|½
|1||style="background:black; color:white"|0
|1||style="background:black; color:white"|½
|½||style="background:black; color:white"|½
|8||1||3||54.50
|- align="center" style="background:white; color:black"
|3||align="left"|
|2733
|½||style="background:black; color:white"|½
|½||style="background:black; color:white"|½
|style="background:gray" colspan="2"| 
|½||style="background:black; color:white"|½
|½||style="background:black; color:white"|½
|1||style="background:black; color:white"|½
|1||style="background:black; color:white"|1
|½||style="background:black; color:white"|0
|8||1||3||54.25
|- align="center" style="background:white; color:black"
|4||align="left"|
|2751
|½||style="background:black; color:white"|½
|½||style="background:black; color:white"|0
|½||style="background:black; color:white"|½
|style="background:gray" colspan="2"| 
|½||style="background:black; color:white"|½
|1||style="background:black; color:white"|½
|½||style="background:black; color:white"|0
|1||style="background:black; color:white"|½
|7|| || ||
|- align="center" style="background:white; color:black"
|5||align="left"|
|2735
|½||style="background:black; color:white"|0
|½||style="background:black; color:white"|½
|½||style="background:black; color:white"|½
|½||style="background:black; color:white"|½
|style="background:gray" colspan="2"| 
|½||style="background:black; color:white"|0
|½||style="background:black; color:white"|½
|1||style="background:black; color:white"|½
|6½|| || ||
|- align="center" style="background:white; color:black"
|6||align="left"|
|2758
|½||style="background:black; color:white"|0
|1||style="background:black; color:white"|0
|½||style="background:black; color:white"|0
|½||style="background:black; color:white"|0
|1||style="background:black; color:white"|½
|style="background:gray" colspan="2"| 
|½||style="background:black; color:white"|½
|1||style="background:black; color:white"|0
|6||1||3||
|- align="center" style="background:white; color:black"
|7||align="left"|
|2750
|0||style="background:black; color:white"|½
|½||style="background:black; color:white"|0
|0||style="background:black; color:white"|0
|1||style="background:black; color:white"|½
|½||style="background:black; color:white"|½
|½||style="background:black; color:white"|½
|style="background:gray" colspan="2"| 
|1||style="background:black; color:white"|½
|6||1||2||
|- align="center" style="background:white; color:black"
|8||align="left"|
|2726
|½||style="background:black; color:white"|0
|½||style="background:black; color:white"|½
|1||style="background:black; color:white"|½
|½||style="background:black; color:white"|0
|½||style="background:black; color:white"|0
|1||style="background:black; color:white"|0
|½||style="background:black; color:white"|0
|style="background:gray" colspan="2"|
|5½|| || ||
|}

Key: H2H = head-to-head, points against tied player; NS = Neustadtl score

For players who finished level on points, the following tie-breakers were applied (in order of precedence): results of games between tied players, total number of wins, Neustadtl score.

Points by round
For each player, the difference between wins and losses after each round is shown.
The players with the highest difference for each round are marked with green background.

References

2007
2007 in chess
2007 in Mexican sports
Chess in Mexico
Sports competitions in Mexico City
2000s in Mexico City
September 2007 sports events in North America